John William Lambert (January 29, 1860  May 20, 1952) was an American automobile manufacturer pioneer and inventor. He is the inventor of the first practical American gasoline automobile. He operated large manufacturing companies that made transmissions, stationary gas engines, farm tractors, commercial motor trucks, railroad inspection vehicles, and various gasoline driven street cars. He had over 600 patents. In 1891, he built a working gasoline automobile, one year before the Duryea Brothers constructed theirs.

Early life 

Lambert was born on January 29, 1860, in Champaign County, Ohio. His parents were George Lambert and Anna (Liber) Lambert. They were both natives of Pennsylvania and pioneers of Ohio. Lambert was the third child of ten children in the family.  He received his education in the local public schools where he grew up as a child.

In 1876 at the age of 16 Lambert invented the first automatic corn planter and manufactured hundreds of them from his hometown of Mechanicsburg, Ohio. In either 1875 or 1876, Lambert's father took him on a trip to a tannery, to see an engine that ran without a steam boiler. Upon arriving, he was disappointed to see that building had burned down the night before. He was curious about the engine he was supposed to have seen in operation, so he investigated the still-warm ashes and ruins to find the burned engine. He found it, and examined its parts to figure out how it worked. It was a slide valve coal gas engine.

Mid life
In 1885, Lambert and his brothers moved to Union City, Ohio. There, John went into a partnership arrangement with his father, and formed an agricultural implement enterprise called J.W. Lambert & Company. The company made and sold farm equipment. After a few years doing this, he relocated to Ohio City, Ohio. There, he operated a farm equipment store, lumber yard, and grain elevator business. He also owned commercial real estate, including the town's opera house and the town hall.

In 1890, Lambert got involved in financing the development of a three-cylinder gasoline engine designed by John B. Hicks, an inventor from Cleveland. His initial investment was $200, and more was needed as time went on. Lambert supplied the increments needed, until he had given Hicks $3300. Lambert made a written agreement with Hicks on the engine, for a license to manufacture it with whatever modifications he felt necessary. He used Hicks' engineers to further modify the design of the engine. Machining was done by Lowell Machine Company. Lambert removed two cylinders, making it a one-cylinder engine. The engine was still not operating entirely correctly after these alterations; in January 1891, he had the unfinished engine and its components shipped to him from Cleveland. Once it arrived in Ohio City, he performed further modifications to make it operational, and designed a unique carburetor to work with the upgraded engine.

Also in January 1891, Lambert designed, and started construction on, a three-wheel carriage vehicle. Before the end of the month, he finished the three-wheel buggy and installed his lightweight engine on it for propulsion. He successfully test-drove the self-propelled buggy at that point, inside the  farm equipment showroom he owned and managed in Ohio City. He made some changes to the steering lever controlling the front wheel, making it a stirrup device operated by the feet instead.

The Lambert gasoline engine propelled buggy was the first practical gasoline automobile made in the United States that could be driven on roads. He made his horseless carriage in 1891, and was ahead of the Duryea Brothers by a year and Henry Ford by five years. During initial tests, it often took a long time to get the automobile started again after it stopped. The original three-wheel car was destroyed in a building fire where he had it stored; however, photographs taken of it did survive. Lambert made sales brochures, which he mailed out in the first part of February 1891, to sell versions of his buggy for $550. Later in that month, he began to take the buggy on the streets of Ohio City for experimental drives.  There were about 300 different styles of horseless carriages built by others by 1895.

Lambert's vehicle was drawn up by a German architectural draftsman of Cleveland named William Watcholtz, one of Hicks' engineers. The tri-wheeled automobile had  rear wheels and a  front center wheel, by which it was steered using foot pedals. It had wooden wheels, with steel tires, and could carry two passengers. Lambert patented his carburetor in 1902. He had inquires for more information on his buggy automobile, but made no sales.

Lambert, in 1893, relocated to Anderson, Ohio, taking some of his machinery with him. The new facility, made of brick, occupied around six acres and employed 250 people. It became the Buckeye Manufacturing Company, and the Lambert Gas and Gasoline Engine Company. The facility updated its equipment to manufacture automobiles in 1902, becoming the Union Automobile Company. Lambert's father became the president of the new enterprises, and Lambert himself became the treasurer and general manager of these ventures.

Lambert is recognized by the Smithsonian Institution as the inventor of America's first gasoline powered car. The institute's museum and research center collections department holds several documents and photographs in Washington, D.C., that have been used by historians over the years to determine Lambert's gasoline buggy, also called the Buckeye gasoline buggy, as the first operational gasoline automobile made in the United States. He is also credited with the first American automobile accident. In 1891, while testing his horseless carriage, Lambert drove it into a tree root and accidentally ran into a hitching post. Lambert was driving the gasoline powered vehicle at the time and carrying a passenger by the name of James Swoveland, a local businessman that operated the city's drug store.

There was secrecy surrounding the development of his automobile. Operational tests were conducted with the blinds pulled at the farm implement showroom where he ran it. Outdoor road tests were conducted at night, on roads that were seldom used. The few who saw it were mostly unaware of the machine's nature, due to the horseless carriage being a totally unfamiliar concept.

After World War I, the Lambert Automobile Company "realized that automobile production had to be conducted on a very large scale"; as it was unable to derive the necessary economy of scale from mass production to price its products competitively, it pivoted to other areas of manufacturing, and  still operated factories in Ohio.

Innovations and patents
Lambert held over 600 patents in his career, most to do with the automobile. Some notable examples of his inventions, and patents:
 The first gasoline engine automobile in the United States
 A friction transmission for automobiles
 A corn seeder that planted three seeds at a time, his first patent (registered in 1876 when he was 16)

Personal life 
Lambert married Mary F. Kelly in 1884. She was from Ansonia, Ohio They had two sons, E. Moe and Roy, who were associated with him in business.

Later life and legacy
Lambert died in Anderson, Indiana, on May 20, 1952. Lambert Days is a community celebration that honors the life of John W. Lambert, the first gasoline-powered single-cylinder vehicle, and the world's first car wreck. This is an annual three-day event that takes place in Ohio City, Ohio, on the third weekend of July. Activities and events include a car show, art festival, flea market, sporting events, parade, live entertainment, and Lambert automobile displays.

See also
 Union automobile
 Lambert automobile
 Lambert-Parent House
 Lambert Automobile Company
 Buckeye Manufacturing Company

References

Sources

Further reading

External links
 John W Lambert from the History of Madison County, Indiana
 Obituary of James A. Swoveland
 Anderson Automobile History
 Carol Jean Lambert

American inventors
People from Anderson, Indiana
American automotive pioneers
People from Van Wert County, Ohio
1860 births
1952 deaths
People from Mechanicsburg, Ohio
People from Union City, Ohio